Ixtlán Zapotec is a Zapotec dialect cluster of Oaxaca, Mexico.

Varieties share about 80% mutual intelligibility. They are:
Yareni (Western Ixtlán, Etla Zapotec), spoken in Santa Ana Yareni.
Atepec (Macuiltianguis Zapotec), spoken in San Juan Atepec and San Pablo Macuiltianguis.
Central Ixtlan
Sierra de Juárez

Yavesía Zapotec (Southeastern Ixtlán) is somewhat more divergent.

Yareni Zapotec speakers can communicate with speakers of related Zapotec variants in the towns of Teococuilco de Marcos Pérez, San Miguel Aloapam, and San Isidro Aloápam (Aloápam Zapotec).

References

Sources 
 Foreman, John. 2006. The Morphosyntax of Subjects in Macuiltianguis Zapotec. Ph.D. Dissertation, UCLA.
 Nellis, Neil and Jane Goodner Nellis. 1983. Diccionario Zapoteco de Juarez. Instituto Lingüístico de Verano. Mexico.
 Bartholomew, Doris A. 1983. Grammatica Zapoteca, in Neil Nellis and Jane Goodner Nellis Diccionario Zapoteco de Juarez Instituto Lingüístico de Verano. Mexico.
 Bickmore, Lee S. and George A. Broadwell. 1998. High tone docking in Sierra Juárez Zapotec.   International Journal of American Linguistics, 64:37-67.
 Gibbs, William P. 1977. Discourse elements in Sierra de Juarez Zapotec. M.A. thesis. University of Texas at Arlington.

External links 

Santa Ana Yareni Zapotec Language resources
Sierra de Juárez Zapotec Language resources
OLAC resources in and about the Yareni Zapotec language 
OLAC resources in and about the Sierra de Juárez Zapotec language

Zapotec languages